Hanevik is a village in the municipality of Askøy in Vestland county, Norway. It is located along the Herdlefjorden, on the northeastern shore of the island of Askøy.  The lake Askevatnet lies just southeast of the village.

History
Hanevik was historically a part of the parish and municipality of Hammer.  In 1885, Hammer was divided and Hanevik became a part of the new municipality of Alversund. On 15 October 1923, Hanevik and all of Alversund on the island of Holsnøy was separated to become the new municipality of Meland. On 1 January 1964, Hanevik was transferred from Meland to the municipality of Askøy. At that time, the village had 193 inhabitants.

References

Villages in Vestland
Askøy